Beša is a village and municipality in Michalovce District in the Kosice Region of eastern Slovakia.

History
In historical records the village was first mentioned in 1260.

Geography
The village lies at an altitude of 107 metres and covers an area of  (2020-06-30/-07-01).

Ethnicity
The population is 96% Hungarian in ethnicity.

Economy
The village has a food store.

Sports
The village has a football pitch.

Transport
The nearest railway station is located 6 kilometres away at Vojany.

Genealogical resources

The records for genealogical research are available at the state archive "Statny Archiv in Kosice, Slovakia"

 Roman Catholic church records (births/marriages/deaths): 1818-1898 (parish A)
 Reformated church records (births/marriages/deaths): 1781-1876 (parish B)

See also
 List of municipalities and towns in Slovakia

References

External links
https://web.archive.org/web/20071217080336/http://www.statistics.sk/mosmis/eng/run.html
Surnames of living people in Besa

Villages and municipalities in Michalovce District